The Rail Passenger Rights Regulation 2007 (EC) No 1371/2007 gives railway passengers basic rights in EU law to refunds and minimum levels of service. It has mandatory application, without implementing legislation. Before this many countries, such as the United Kingdom, had no rights set in law for rail passengers. The Regulation creates minimum rights which every member state law, and every rail undertaking, may improve upon.

New EU rail rules which came into place in November 2018 however risk undermining these existing passenger rail rights.

Contents
The following is a summary of the Regulation's provisions:

article 3, definitions 
art 5, enable bikes on trains if it does not adversely affect rail
art 6, obligations to passengers under this Regulation cannot be waived, but duties can be more favourable
art 7, info on discontinuing services
art 8, travel info, set out in Annex I and II
art 9, tickets and reservations by ticket offices, machines, telephone, web or on board
art 10, travel info and reservation
art 11, liability for passengers and luggage under Annex I
art 12, insurance, obligations in Directive 95/18/EC art 9. 
art 13, advance payments 
art 14, if a railway contests responsibility for injury it should make every effort to help a passenger in claiming from a third party 
art 15, delay liability, Annex I. A passenger facing a delay of an hour or more may request a partial reimbursement of the price paid for the ticket
art 16, reimbursement and re-routing
art 17, compensation of ticket price: 25% of the ticket price for a 60-119 min delay, 50% for 120 min or more. Season tickets in accordance with company policy. Threshold claim is €4. 
art 18, assistance, kept informed. For delay over 60mins, free meals and refreshments if can reasonably be supplied on train or station, hotel or accommodation, transport from the train to railway station if blocked. 
art 19, disabled right to transport
art 20, information
art 21, accessibility
arts 22-25, assistance on board, etc
art 26, manager risks of security
art 27, companies shall set up a complaint handling mechanism and make contact details widely known
art 28, service quality standards
art 29, info and enforcement
arts 32-37, final provisions
Annex I, Extract from Uniform Rules concerning the contract for international carriage of passengers and luggage by rail (CIV)

See also
EU law
Flight Compensation Regulation 2004
Bus Passenger Rights Regulation 2011
UK enterprise law
Railways in the UK

Notes

United Kingdom enterprise law
European Union law
2007 in British law
1371